Carlos Rivero may refer to:

 Carlos Rivero (baseball) (born 1988), Venezuelan ballplayer
 Carlos Rivero (footballer) (born 1992), Venezuelan footballer
 Carlos Rivero (musician), Argentine folk musician

See also
 Rivero (surname)
 Carlos Rivera (disambiguation)